Grit Hegesa (31 December 1891 – 17 January 1972) was a German dancer and silent film actress. She appeared in seventeen films, including Ewald André Dupont's Whitechapel. She was born Caroline Margaretha Schmidt.

Selected filmography
 Madness (1919)
 Whitechapel (1920)
 The White Peacock (1920)
 Man Overboard (1921)
 Night and No Morning (1921)
 Children of Darkness (1921)
 Fräulein Else (1929)

References

Bibliography
 Prawer, S.S. Between Two Worlds: The Jewish Presence in German and Austrian Film, 1910-1933. Berghahn Books, 2005.

External links

1891 births
1972 deaths
German female dancers
German film actresses
German silent film actresses
20th-century German actresses